Jehangir Nusli Wadia (born 6 July 1973), also known as Jeh Wadia, is an Indian businessman, who was the Managing Director of Go First, Bombay Dyeing and Bombay Realty. He was also a Director on the Boards of Britannia Industries, The Bombay Burmah Trading Corp. Ltd, Wadia Techno – Engineering Services Limited & others.

Life and career

Jehangir (also known as Jeh) was born in Mumbai to businessman Nusli Wadia and former air hostess Maureen Wadia. He has one brother, Ness Wadia, who is a businessman. His father is the son of Neville Wadia and Dina Wadia. His great-grandfather, Sir Ness Wadia, played an important role in turning the city of Bombay into one of the worlds largest cotton gin trading centers during the late 19th century. His grandmother was the daughter of Muhammad Ali Jinnah the founder of Pakistan. Jehangir did his initial schooling at the Lawrence School in Sanawar and moved to a boarding school in England to complete his graduation. Jehangir earned a master's degree in science from the Warwick University in England.

The Bombay High Court in 1999 stopped Wadia from holding a New Year's Eve rave party in Goa, for which he had illegally occupied government-owned land. 

Wadia is married to Celina since 2003 who is from Australia, they met in London and have two children together, Jr. Jahangir and Ella. Celina runs her own fashion line under the brand name C Femme.

Wadia is the managing director of GoAir (founded in 2005). The World Economic Forum elected him as a Young Global Leader in the year 2008. Wadia was the Managing Director of Go First, Bombay Dyeing and its real estate division Bombay Realty. He is also a Director on the Boards of Britania Britannia Industries, The Bombay Burmah Trading Corp, Wadia Techno – Engineering Services Limited & others.

References

Living people
1973 births
Indian aviation businesspeople
Parsi people from Mumbai
Businesspeople from Mumbai
Lawrence School, Sanawar alumni
Wadia family